The 1975 Iowa State Cyclones football team represented Iowa State University in the Big Eight Conference during the 1975 NCAA Division I football season. In their third year under head coach Earle Bruce, the Cyclones compiled a 4–7 record (1–6 against conference opponents), finished in seventh place in the conference, and were outscored by opponents by a combined total of 263 to 161. They played their home games at Cyclone Stadium (now known as Jack Trice Stadium) in Ames, Iowa.

Sy Bassett, Bob Bos, Jeff Jones, and Ray King were the team captains.

Schedule

Roster

References

Iowa State
Iowa State Cyclones football seasons
Iowa State Cyclones football